LiLana (born 1985) is a Bulgarian singer and ex-TV host. She is best known for her appearance in the celebrity spin-off of the reality show Big Brother – VIP Brother.

In 2009 LiLana came into public eye with a song named "Dime Piece" featuring Big Sha & Snoop Dogg. The idea for the song came when she met Big Sha in the live studio of Big Brother 4 Bulgaria at the end of 2008.

References

1987 births
Living people
21st-century Bulgarian women singers
Bulgarian pop singers
Musicians from Sofia